The fourth season of the American science fiction television series Fringe premiered on Fox on September 23, 2011, and concluded on May 11, 2012, consisting of 22 episodes. The series is produced by Bad Robot Productions in association with Warner Bros. Television, and its showrunners were Jeff Pinkner and J.H. Wyman. The show was officially renewed for a fourth season on March 24, 2011. Lead actors Anna Torv, John Noble, and Joshua Jackson reprised their roles as FBI agent Olivia Dunham and the father-son duo Walter and Peter Bishop. Previous series regulars Lance Reddick, Jasika Nicole, and Blair Brown also returned. Previous recurring guest star Seth Gabel was promoted to series regular. Prominent guest star Leonard Nimoy and first season guest star Jared Harris reprised their roles in the alternate timeline storyline. Former main cast member and previous recurring guest star Kirk Acevedo, however, did not reprise his role.

The season follows the truce between the two inextricable universes through a bridge Peter created after his consciousness was driven forward fifteen years to make a different choice in activating the doomsday device, as seen in the third season finale. The first part of the season establishes an alternate timeline through the premise of one single character's absence: Peter himself. After being erased by the Observer named September (Michael Cerveris), subtle and drastic changes occur. An amber title sequence replaces the traditional blue opening sequence, and thus the new timeline was dubbed the "Amber timeline". The differences in history without Peter are remarked upon casually in each episode.

The fourth season received generally positive reviews by television critics. Despite its low ratings, viewership was more stable than the previous season which saw a 2.5 million viewership drop from its premiere to the finale. The season premiered with 3.48 million viewers and concluded with 3.11 million viewers. Reviewers reacted well to the reintegration of Jackson's character in the alternate timeline, the return of David Robert Jones (portrayed by Harris), and the performances of Torv and Noble, who each played differing versions of their original characters. Criticisms toward the season were pacing issues in its first-half, unanswered questions regarding strong similarities in established history despite Peter's absence, and lack of answers. The series was renewed for a reduced thirteen-episode fifth and final season on April 26, 2012.

Season summary 
After making use of the Wave Form Device to create a bridge between the two universes, Peter's actions have led to a timeline drastically different than the Observers desire. September prevents his initial choice in the second season flashback episode "Peter". He no longer saves a seven-year-old Peter from drowning in 1985 after Walter crossed to and back from one universe to another to cure him. As such, a new timeline is formed and background history of the characters is altered forever. The bridge has created a healing effect on the parallel universe, and both Fringe teams resolve their former differences and begin to work together. 

Olivia and (now more sheltered and reclusive) Walter continue to explore Fringe events, but are aware of a memory of Peter that haunts them. Due to their actions, Peter suddenly materializes in this timeline, though his identity is not initially known nor is he trusted. However, as he spends time with the Fringe team, Olivia starts to gain memories of the original timeline, and though both are initially worried about this effect, allow it to continue on, rediscovering their romance from before. During one case, a wounded September appears to Olivia, warning her that she dies in every future that he can see, before disappearing. September later appears to Peter after he activates a strange artifact, which acted like a homing beacon to September. September explains the other Observers hid this universe from him purposely, and that this timeline is Peter's true home.

As part of the change of the original timeline, David Robert Jones remains alive and is able to cross back and forth between the two universes, using an advanced army of shapeshifters, the parallel universe's version of Nina Sharp, and the parallel Broyles, whom he has blackmailed to initiate events. He gathers a large collection of the mineral amphilicite, which enables him to build devices that can merge the two universes for disastrous results. Both Fringe teams fear that a larger plan is afoot, and later, when Jones is able to trigger microquakes across the globe in both universes simultaneously, the two sides agree that Jones must be stopped before both worlds are destroyed. 

Their first action is to disable the bridge created by the Wave Form Device, believing this enables the simultaneous events, but this proves ineffective. The prime universe Fringe team continues to track Jones' actions, and discover that he is in the employ of William Bell, still alive in this timeline, who seeks to destroy both universes as to create a void for a third one to be made, with Olivia's Cortexiphan abilities enabling this event to occur. In a stalemate, Walter shoots Olivia in the head with a bullet, disrupting Bell's plan, and as Bell escapes, Walter helps to extract the bullet from Olivia, her Cortexiphan healing her body.

After Olivia's recovery, she finds herself pregnant with Peter's child. Walter is approached by September and told that "they are coming", alluding to a future in 2036 where the Observers have taken over humanity.

Cast

Main cast 
 Anna Torv as Olivia Dunham
 Joshua Jackson as Peter Bishop
 John Noble as Dr. Walter Bishop
 Lance Reddick as Phillip Broyles
 Blair Brown as Nina Sharp
 Jasika Nicole as Astrid Farnsworth
 Seth Gabel as Lincoln Lee

Recurring cast 
 Michael Cerveris as September/The Observer
 Jared Harris as David Robert Jones
 Michelle Krusiec as Nadine Park
 Eugene Lipinski as December
 Leonard Nimoy as Dr. William Bell
 Orla Brady as Elizabeth Bishop
 Rebecca Mader as Jessica Holt
 Ryan McDonald as Brandon Fayette

Episodes

Production

Crew
In May 2011, David Fury joined the series as a writer and producer, having previously worked with co-creator J. J. Abrams on Lost. His first writing credit included the season's third episode, "Alone in the World".

Writing

According to executive producers/showrunners Jeff Pinkner and J.H. Wyman, the fourth season would start with the idea that "Peter no longer exists", and also that the audience would "very much see the consequences of what happened in Seasons 1, 2 and 3". These consequences included changes in the past; Pinkner and Wyman noted that though Peter was the impetus for Walter to cross over starting the chain of events, in this alternate history, Walter and William likely would have found their own way to cross, leading to the same events but with some events that "may have happened differently". Specifically, they identified that instead of Walter being brought out of a mental institution by Peter, Olivia becomes the one that does this; this changes Walter's re-acclimation to the outside world, and further alters Astrid's fate, now a field agent instead of being Walter's caretaker. 

The producers stated they would continue to employ the use of flashbacks episodes as they "deepened the emotions of these characters", using these as well as flash-forwards "if it suits the story and the things we are trying to get across". Pinkner and Wyman also stated that they viewed the premiere episode of the fourth season "like a new pilot" to draw in viewers who wanted to watch the show but did not know when to start. Actor John Noble later clarified that this approach can be used "to unravel some of that mythology a bit" to explain the impact of the disappearance of Peter to new viewers. Despite the apparent disappearance of his character, Joshua Jackson remained as a main cast member and his commitment to a full fourth season was confirmed. Jackson stated that Peter will be back on the show, but "will be different than he was before". This fact was played with at the 2011 San Diego Comic Convention where the Fringe cast appeared for a panel; a teaser video showed fake auditions for the open role of Peter, and included cameo appearances by Michael Emerson, Zachary Quinto, Greg Grunberg, Jorge Garcia, Danny Pudi, and Jeff Probst and concluded with Jackson himself dressed as an Observer.

Timeline differences

Summary
After September allowed Peter to drown, Elizabeth Bishop (Orla Brady) immediately committed suicide fifteen years earlier (mentioned in "The Man from the Other Side") in 1985 from the grief of losing her son twice (altered in "Back to Where You've Never Been"). Walter became mad with grief, wanting to destroy both universes to create his own idealized world acting as God ("Brave New World").

Walter still requested William Bell (Leonard Nimoy) remove pieces of his brain out of fear of who he was becoming (as seen in "Grey Matters", and mentioned in "Over There: Part 2"), but Bell took the idea on for himself anyway ("Brave New World: Part 2"). It is implied that Bell's intentions were always dubious in the original timeline, and his fate in the alternate timeline was merely incidental, hence why Junior Agent Amy Jessup (Meghan Markle) connected Fringe cases to the Bible, as Bell had been planning his own Noah's Ark. ("Night of Desirable Objects") 

Olivia ran away from the Cortexiphan trials after six months according to "Subject 9", instead of connecting with Peter during the 1986 experiments to bring him home ("Subject 13"). Without opening up to Peter about her abuse, she still shot her abusive stepfather as a child ("The Cure") but finished him off in the new timeline ("One Night in October"). 

Walter hated Nina Sharp (Blair Brown) for the next 26 years; he blamed her for breaking the vial with the cure for Peter's disease—ultimately leading to the kidnapping and Peter's death ("Subject 9"); her subsequent guilt led her to gain guardianship of the Dunham sisters after Marilyn (Amy Madigan) died of cancer when Olivia and Rachel (Ari Graynor) were due to go into foster care ("Novation"). Following this, Olivia took on some of Nina's hobbies like horseback riding (seen in "The Cure") in her teenage years (seen in "Novation" and "Forced Perspective") while Rachel still met Greg and gave birth to Ella (Lily Pilblad), though their marriage remained in tact and they had a second child named Eddie ("Nothing As It Seems"). "Brave New World: Part 2" reveals Senator Van Horn (Gerard Plunkett) was never replaced by a shapeshifter and is alive. 

"Neither Here Nor There" shows that Olivia was able to release Walter from the mental institution without a living relative, instead of Peter originally ("Pilot"). However, without Peter, Walter has become reclusive and refuses to leave the laboratory. "Alone in the World" reveals monthly evaluations by the director of St. Claire's were a condition for Walter's release from the institution. The fourth season opener also reveals Walter was unable to save John Scott (Mark Valley) during the Flight 627 investigation, leaving Richard Steig (Jason Butler Harner)'s fate unknown in the rewritten timeline (as Scott killed him upon his recovery originally). Consequently, Astrid Farnsworth is a field agent to account for Walter's agaraphobia. 

She had never crossed over to the parallel universe as her abilities were never enhanced or manipulated (as the initial experiments to try and send Peter home in 1986 never happened). ("Back to Where You've Never Been") Fauxlivia still took her place, as seen previously ("Over There: Part 2"), though Colonel Broyles never died as Olivia's brainwashing or Cortexiphan experiments were never conducted on her ("Entrada"). These events only occurred when Walternate became aware of her abilities from the Peter-influenced confession she made as a child ("Subject 13"), leaving the cases she solved in the parallel universe unresolved, such as predictive criminal Milo Stanfield (Michael Eklund). Another difference is Lincoln Lee (Seth Gabel)'s father is alive, after being previously being mentioned to have recently died in his first appearance ("Over There: Part 1"). 

Olivia was instead kidnapped by Fauxlivia in the prime universe ("One Night in October") and transported as a prison captive in the parallel universe for two weeks while Fauxlivia did espionage. ("Making Angels") "Back to Where You've Never Been" reveals Olivia is unaware of her ability to cross over (as initial experiments to try and send Peter home in 1986 never happened), also revealing she never sought treatment after her car accident from bowling alley attendant Sam Weiss (Kevin Corrigan), and as confirmed in the season five episode "Black Blotter", Olivia never met him in the alternate timeline. 

"One Night in October" reveals Fauxlivia still lived with her boyfriend Frank (Philip Winchester) who had broken up with her after discovering she was pregnant with Peter's child ("Immortality"), though they later separated in the new timeline for undisclosed reasons ("The Consultant"). Meanwhile, Alternate Charlie married Mona Foster (Julie McNiven) from "Immortality" and was on honeymoon with her during the events of "One Night in October". Sally Clark (Pascale Hutton) and Nick Lane (David Call) are alive, having never crossed over to rescue Peter ("Worlds Apart"), but Lincoln was still blown up ("Everything In Its Right Place"), presumably due to a superhearing Olivia ("Night of Desirable Objects")'s absence to alert them of the bomb during Joshua Rose (Shawn Ashmore)'s apartment explosion ("Amber 31422"). Olivia also never met any Cortexiphan subjects as an adult until Cameron (Chadwick Boseman), meaning Nick was recruited by Jones earlier in the timeline than the events of "Bad Dreams". 

Furthermore, without Peter, David Robert Jones (Jared Harris) successfully escaped into the parallel universe ("There's More Than One of Everything"), later appearing to cause havoc in both universes where he creates organic shapeshifters that appear human ("Back to Where You've Never Been"). Initially it is believed he crossed over to kill Bell, but it is revealed in "Brave New World: Part 1" he crossed over to impress him and become his protege.

Reception

Critical reception

On Rotten Tomatoes, the season has an approval rating of 100% with an average score of 7.1 out of 10 based on 12 reviews. The website's critical consensus reads, "A daring reset may baffle casual viewers, but those already enthralled by Fringes knotty mythology will likely become even more invested."

IGN reviewer Ramsey Isler gave the fourth season a score of 7.5 out of 10, calling it "not Fringes best." His criticisms were that he felt the first third of the season was "inconsistent", with some episodes feeling "aimless", and the absence of Joshua Jackson as Peter in the beginning of the season hurt the show. Isler was more positive of the second half of the season, labeling the episode "Enemy of My Enemy" as the turning point of the season, with the reintroduction of villain David Robert Jones (played by Jared Harris). He highlighted "The End of All Things" as the best of the season, saying it had "absolutely brilliant writing and clever plot twists". The episodes "A Short Story About Love" and "Letters of Transit" were also named standouts, with the latter episode being called "intriguing and bold". He also enjoyed the return of William Bell (Leonard Nimoy), calling it "the biggest and most welcome surprise of the season". He concluded in saying the two-part finale wrapped up "adequately", but felt the biggest strength was the setting up for the final season, with the world we saw in "Letters of Transit".

After viewing "Letters of Transit", the season's 19th episode, Entertainment Weekly columnist Ken Tucker stated, "I've said it before: One reason Fringe has a tough time attracting a big audience is that the mass audience that's dropped away doesn't realize how much heart and soul, how much well-wrought romanticism, has been poured into this series, while its cult audience is regularly grumpy that Fringe declines to turn into the sci-fi epic some seem to want it to be. I know this season's timeline switcheroo has alienated some viewers, but even when the show veers off into mythology complexities that start to give me the megrims, I keep faith that Fringe is going to bring it back to the heart of what matters."

Ratings
The season premiere was watched by an estimated 3.5 million viewers. It scored a 1.5/5 ratings share among viewers 18-49, up 25% from the previous spring's season finale. By the end of November 2011, Fringe was the network's lowest rated program.

According to a report released by Nielsen Company, Fringe was the only network television series among the top ten of most time-shifted shows of 2011. The report continued that time shifting increased the series' overall audience by eighty percent.

Home media release

References

External links 

 
 

4
2011 American television seasons
2012 American television seasons